Edward Hutchins may refer to:

 Edward H. Hutchins (born 1948), book artist and publisher
 Edward John Hutchins (1809–1876), English politician and railway director